A Reformed Santa Claus is a 1911 American silent black and white family drama film starring Charles Kent and Helen Gardner.

Cast
 Charles Kent as Harrison
 Helen Gardner as The Widow
 Dolores Costello as The Widow's 1st Child
 Helene Costello as The Widow's 2nd Child
 George Stewart
 Alec B. Francis
 Leo Delaney
 Charles Eldridge

References

External links
 

American silent short films
American black-and-white films
1911 drama films
1911 films
American children's drama films
Vitagraph Studios short films
General Film Company
1910s American films
Silent American drama films